James Graham Fair (1831–1894) was a U.S. Senator from Nevada from 1881 to 1887. Senator Fair may also refer to:

Mike Fair (born 1946), South Carolina State Senate
Robert James Fair (1919–2002), Indiana State Senate